Mattia Cinquini (born 11 May 1990) is an Italian professional footballer who plays for Rapperswil-Jona in Switzerland.

Club career
On 30 July 2022, Cinquini signed a one-year contract with Rapperswil-Jona in Swiss Promotion League.

References

External links 

 MATTIA CINQUINI Στατιστικά 2020-2021
 SFL Profile

1990 births
People from Cuneo
Sportspeople from the Province of Cuneo
Footballers from Piedmont
Living people
Italian footballers
Association football defenders
GC Biaschesi players
FC Lugano players
Enosis Neon Paralimni FC players
Nea Salamis Famagusta FC players
FC Chiasso players
FC Köniz players
Ħamrun Spartans F.C. players
Ayia Napa FC players
FC Rapperswil-Jona players
Swiss 1. Liga (football) players
Cypriot First Division players
Cypriot Second Division players
Swiss Challenge League players
Swiss Promotion League players
Maltese Premier League players
Swiss Super League players
Italian expatriate footballers
Expatriate footballers in Switzerland
Italian expatriate sportspeople in Switzerland
Expatriate footballers in Cyprus
Italian expatriate sportspeople in Cyprus
Expatriate footballers in Malta
Italian expatriate sportspeople in Malta